John Liman Hamburg (born May 26, 1970) is an American screenwriter, film director and producer.

Personal life
Hamburg was born to a Jewish family in Manhattan, the son of New York City radio personality Joan Hamburg and Morton I. Hamburg. He graduated from Brown University in 1992 with a degree in history. He then attended the Tisch School of the Arts at New York University.

Hamburg is married to actress Christina Kirk.

Career
After screening his 1996 short film Tick at the Sundance Film Festival, Hamburg wrote and directed the 1998 film Safe Men. Hamburg then found greater success co-writing Meet the Parents and Zoolander, and returned to the director's chair with Along Came Polly, which he also wrote. He also co-wrote the sequel Meet the Fockers. In 2009, Hamburg wrote and directed the hit comedy I Love You, Man. He wrote the second sequel to Meet the Parents, entitled Little Fockers. 

In 2016, Hamburg co-wrote the sequel Zoolander 2, which grossed $56 million at the box office compared to a $50 million budget, and directed and co-wrote the comedy Why Him? for 20th Century Fox. In 2022, he wrote and directed the Netflix film Me Time starring Kevin Hart and Mark Wahlberg.

Filmography

Film

Television

References

External links

1970 births
Living people
20th-century American Jews
20th-century American male writers
20th-century American screenwriters
21st-century American Jews
21st-century American male writers
21st-century American screenwriters
American film producers
American male screenwriters
American television directors
Brown University alumni
Comedy film directors
Film directors from New York City
Film producers from New York (state)
Jewish American screenwriters
Screenwriters from New York (state)
Television producers from New York (state)
Tisch School of the Arts alumni
Writers from Manhattan